Castell de Cabres is a municipality located in the province of Castellón, Valencian Community, Spain.

References

Municipalities in the Province of Castellón
Baix Maestrat